Sinderhope is a village situated on the east Allen Valley in south-west Northumberland.
The population is around 80. The mainstay of employment is sheep-farming.

Wildlife is plentiful with many examples of rare birds of Great Britain, such as the black grouse, Eurasian whimbrel and Eurasian curlew.
The local beauty spot is a ford with wild flowers and a wood called Oldman Bottom, often mistakenly called "Old Man's Bottom".

The whole area is part of the North Pennines Area of Outstanding Natural Beauty.

References

External links

Villages in Northumberland